This is a list of British television related events from 1972.

Events

January
19 January – The government of Edward Heath announces the lifting of all restrictions on broadcasting hours on television and radio.

February
No events.

March
 1 March – Border begins broadcasting in colour from the Selkirk transmitter.
25 March – The 17th Eurovision Song Contest is held at the Usher Hall in Edinburgh. Luxembourg wins the contest with the song Après toi, performed by Vicky Leandros.

April
4 April – 
 BBC1 launch the children's news programme Newsround with the presenter John Craven.   
 After a three-year courtship, Emily Nugent marries Ernest Bishop on Coronation Street.
14 April – Hosted by Chris Kelly, Clapperboard, the long-running cinema themed children's programme debuts on ITV.  
18 April – ITV Anglia begins showing the first series (following two previous TV movies) of the US detective series Columbo.  Starring Peter Falk as the titular "Lieutenant Frank Columbo" in the episode "Murder by the Book".  Other ITV regions commence broadcasting the series shortly after.

May
No events.

June
Light and Tuneful became the new opening theme tune for the BBC's coverage of the Wimbledon Tennis Championships.

July
8 July – Granada broadcasts Sesame Street for the first time.
24 July – The Independent Television Authority (ITA) is renamed the Independent Broadcasting Authority (IBA).

August
26 August–11 September – The BBC and ITV broadcast full coverage of the 1972 Summer Olympic Games with the BBC providing approximately eight hours a day of live coverage each day.

September
8 September – The department store set comedy series Are You Being Served? debuts on BBC1. The series becomes one of the longest running BBC comedy shows and goes on to spawn a 1977 British feature film and the spin-off series Grace & Favour.
11 September 
 The long running quiz show Mastermind airs for the first time on BBC1.
 Nationwide starts broadcasting five days a week. Previously, it had been broadcast only on Tuesdays and Thursdays.
 After eight years of episodes being shown different days at various ITV regions, Crossroads finally gets broadcast across the network with Granada Television showing it for the first time. The series is still being shown at different times across the regions.
17 September – The family adventure series The Adventures of Black Beauty is broadcast on ITV.

October
1 October – London Weekend Television launches the UK's first Sunday politics programme – Weekend World. It continues until 1988.
2 October – Following the lifting of restrictions on broadcasting hours, BBC1 and ITV are allowed to begin broadcasting during the day. BBC1's afternoon schedule launches with the first edition of a new lunchtime magazine programme Pebble Mill at One.
16 October – ITV launches its afternoon service. As part of the new service the first edition of Emmerdale Farm is broadcast, produced by Yorkshire Television and ITV's first lunchtime news programme, First Report, is shown. ITV Schools is now shown in a single morning block, between the hours of 9:30am and 12pm. 
23 October – The BBC announces that development work has begun on the Ceefax teletext service.

November
5 November – BBC2 begins showing the horror anthology series Dead of Night with the episode "The Exorcism".
12 November – ITV broadcast the first episode of the influential children's programme Rainbow featuring the characters "Zippy", "George" and "Bungle the Bear".

December
15 December – The Roy Castle and Norris McWhirter hosted children's TV show featuring world record attempts, Record Breakers debuts on BBC1.
25 December – BBC2 shows the supernatural drama The Stone Tape.
30 December – The BBC airs part one of The Three Doctors, a four-part serial of the science-fiction programme Doctor Who created to celebrate its tenth series (the tenth anniversary will not be until 23 November of the following year).

Unknown
The BBC Schools and Colleges service is converted to colour and started using the Diamond ident which stays until 1977.
 The UK's Minister for Posts and Telecommunications authorises five experimental community cable television channels.
London Weekend Television opens its purpose-built studios called The London Studios although they are not fully operational until 1974.

Debuts

BBC1
3 January – Mandog (1972)
6 January – The Brighton Belle (1972)
9 January – Engelbert with the Young Generation (1972)
13 January – The Adventures of Sir Prancelot (1972)
16 January – The Moonstone (1972)
3 February –Six with Rix (1972)
11 February – The Scobie Man (1972)
14 February – Fingerbobs (1972)
19 February – The Befrienders (1972)
20 February – Anne of Green Gables (1972)
21 February – The Regiment (1972–1973)
1 March – Crystal Tipps and Alistair (1972–1974)
10 March – The Brothers (1972–1976)
13 March – Spy Trap (1972–1975)
23 March – It's Murder But Is It Art? (1972)
4 April – Newsround (1972–present)
5 April – Lord Peter Wimsey (1972–1975)
10 April – Tales from the Lazy Acre (1972)
12 May – The Man Outside (1972)
15 June – The Burke Special (1972–1976)
30 June – Cabbages and Kings (1972–1974)
10 July – Birds in the Bush (1972)
27 July – Them (1972)
16 August – No Exit (1972)
8 September – Are You Being Served? (1972–1985)
11 September – Mastermind (1972–present)
14 September – Sykes  (1972–1979)
19 September – My Wife Next Door (1972)
25 September – The Long Chase (1972)
2 October – Pebble Mill at One (1972–1986)
8 October – The Hole in the Wall (1972)
19 October – Colditz (1972–1974)
16 November – The Film Programme (1972–present)
17 November – Jackanory Playhouse (1972–1985)
26 November – Cranford (1972)
15 December – Record Breakers (1972–2001)
27 December – Thursday's Child (1972–1973)

BBC2
6 January – The Shadow of the Tower (1972)
8 January – Ways of Seeing (1972)
16 January – Up Sunday (1972–1973)
30 January – Man of Straw (1972)
18 February –  Clochemerle (1972)
29 February – Walk into the Dark (1972)
9 April – Mistress of Hardwick (1972)
21 April – Beyond a Joke (1972)
23 April – The Lotus Eaters (1972–1973)
4 May – The Golden Bowl (1972)
5 June – His Lordship Entertains (1972)
13 June – The Sextet (1972)
15 June –  The Visitors (1972)
6 July – Shelley (1972)
20 July – Emma (1972)
31 August – Love and Mr Lewisham (1972)
15 September – Michael Bentine Time (1972)
24 September – Six Faces (1972)
28 September – War and Peace (1972–1973)
1 October – Milligan in...  (1972–1973)
8 October – Scoop (1972)
5 November – Dead of Night (1972)
7 November – The Gangster Show: The Resistable Rise of Arturo Ui (1972)
12 November – America (1972–1973)
21 November – The Edwardians (1972–1973)
26 November – Grubstreet (1972–1973)
3 December – But Seriously, It's Sheila Hancock (1972)
25 December – The Stone Tape (1972)

ITV
2 January – The Intruder (1972)
3 January – The Challengers (1972)
8 January – Who Do You Do? (1972–1976)
19 January – Tightrope (1972)
21 January – Spyder's Web (1972)
23 January – Adam Smith (1972–1973)
14 February – Home and Away (1972)
15 February – Romany Jones (1972–1975)
19 February – Both Ends Meet (1972)
24 February – My Good Woman (1972–1974)
27 February – Pretenders (1972)
28 February – Hep Hep (1972)
7 March – Des (1972)
4 April –  A Place in the Sun (1972)
7 April – Shirley's World (1972)
8 April – Funny You Should Say That (1972)
9 April – Doctor in Charge (1972–1973)
10 April 
 Pardon My Genie (1972–1973)
 Six Days of Justice (1972–1975)
12 April – Late Night Theatre (1972–1974)
13 April – Love Thy Neighbour (1972–1976)
14 April – Clapperboard (1972–1982)
16 April –  The Organization (1972)
18 April – Columbo (1968, 1971–1978)
19 April – Escape Into Night (1972)
22 April – New Scotland Yard (1972–1974)
8 May – The David Nixon Magic Show (1972–1977)
14 May – The Frighteners (1972)
20 May – The Train Now Standing (1972–1973)
31 May – Fly Into Danger (1972)
5 June – Alcock and Gander (1972)
2 July – Villains (1972)
7 July – In for a Penny (1972)
21 July – The Man from Haven (1972)
15 August – Whodunnit? (1972–1978)
18 August – Shut That Door!  (1972–1973)
20 August – Country Matters (1972)
1 September – Holly (1972)
13 September – Van der Valk (1972–1973, 1977, 1991–1992, 2020)
17 September – The Adventures of Black Beauty (1972–1974)
27 September – The Pathfinders (1972–1973)
29 September 
 The Adventurer (1972–1973)
 The Protectors (1972–1974)
 The New Adventures of Madeline (1972–1981)
1 October – Weekend World (1972–1988)
2 October – The Stanley Baxter Picture Show (1972–1975)
11 October – Crown Court (1972–1984)
16 October – Emmerdale Farm (1972–present)
17 October – Harriet's Back in Town (1972–1973)
19 October – General Hospital (1972–1979)
21 October – Russell Harty Plus (1972–1977)
23 October – Spring & Autumn (1972–1976)
31 October – Thirty Minutes Worth (1972–1973)
7 November – The Strauss Family (1972)
12 November – Rainbow (1972–1992) 
17 November – Turnbull's Finest Half-Hour (1972)
18 November – The Reg Varney Revue (1972)
4 December – The Black Arrow (1972–1975)
6 December – Arthur of the Britons (1972–1973)
24 December – Joseph and the Amazing Technicolor Dreamcoat (1972)

Continuing television shows

1920s
BBC Wimbledon (1927–1939, 1946–2019, 2021–present)

1930s
The Boat Race (1938–1939, 1946–2019)
BBC Cricket (1939, 1946–1999, 2020–2024)

1940s
Come Dancing (1949–1998)

1950s
Watch with Mother (1952–1975) 
The Good Old Days (1953–1983)
Panorama (1953–present)
Dixon of Dock Green (1955–1976)
Crackerjack (1955–1984, 2020–present)
Opportunity Knocks (1956–1978, 1987–1990)
This Week (1956–1978, 1986–1992)
Armchair Theatre (1956–1974)
What the Papers Say (1956–2008)
The Sky at Night (1957–present)
Blue Peter (1958–present)
Grandstand (1958–2007)

1960s
Coronation Street (1960–present)
Songs of Praise (1961–present)
Steptoe and Son (1962–1965, 1970–1974)
Z-Cars (1962–1978)
Animal Magic (1962–1983)
Doctor Who (1963–1989, 1996, 2005–present)
World in Action (1963–1998)
Top of the Pops (1964–2006)
Match of the Day (1964–present)
Crossroads (1964–1988, 2001–2003)
Play School (1964–1988)
Mr. and Mrs. (1965–1999)
Call My Bluff (1965–2005)
World of Sport (1965–1985)
Jackanory (1965–1996, 2006)
Sportsnight (1965–1997)
It's a Knockout (1966–1982, 1999–2001)
The Money Programme (1966–2010)
The Golden Shot (1967–1975)
Playhouse (1967–1982)
Father, Dear Father (1968–1973)
Dad's Army (1968–1977)
Magpie (1968–1980)
The Big Match (1968–2002)
On the Buses (1969–1973)
Clangers (1969–1974)
Monty Python's Flying Circus (1969–1974)
Nationwide (1969–1983)
Screen Test (1969–1984)

1970s
The Goodies (1970–1982)
...And Mother Makes Three (1971–1973)
The Fenn Street Gang (1971–1973)
Follyfoot (1971–1973)
Upstairs, Downstairs (1971–1975, 2010–2012)
The Onedin Line (1971–1980)
Sale of the Century (1971–1983, 1989–1991, 1997)
The Old Grey Whistle Test (1971–1987)
The Two Ronnies (1971–1987, 1991, 1996, 2005)

Ending this year
 Callan (1967–1972)
 Please Sir! (1968–1972)
 A Family at War (1970–1972)
 Doomwatch (1970–1972)
 Queenie's Castle (1970–1972)
 Mr Benn (1970–1972, 2005)
 A Class by Himself (1971–1972)
 Budgie (1971–1972)
 The Persuaders! (1971–1972)

Births
 4 January – Charlotte Hudson, English actress
 9 January – Sarah Beeny, property developer and television presenter
 12 January – Sid Owen, actor
 15 January – Claudia Winkleman, television presenter
 23 January 
Harriet Scott, radio and television presenter
Lisa Snowdon, English fashion model, actress and television presenter
 10 February – Helen Willetts, BBC weather presenter
 19 February – Lisa Faulkner, actress
 22 February – Jo Guest, glamour model and media personality
 24 February – James Bachman, comedian, actor and writer
 27 March – Ben Richards, actor (The Bill)
 3 April – Catherine McCormack, English actress
 22 April – Sarah Patterson, actress
 28 April – Anita Anand, journalist and television presenter
 3 May – Katya Adler, broadcast journalist
 19 May – Amanda de Cadenet, television presenter, actress and photographer
 20 May 
Daisy McAndrew, journalist
Tina Hobley, actress
 26 May – Patsy Palmer, actress and television presenter
 4 June — Debra Stephenson, actress
 7 July – Liza Walker, actress
 19 July – Amanda Lamb, model and television presenter
 7 August – Sarah Cawood, television presenter
 9 September – Natasha Kaplinsky, newsreader
 12 September –Gideon Emery, actor
 24 September
 Kate Fleetwood, actress
 Finty Williams, actress 
 29 September – Robert Webb, comic actor
 22 October – Saffron Burrows, actress and model
 2 November – Samantha Womack, actress
 6 November – Thandiwe Newton, actress
 8 November – Ben Hull, actor
 14 December – Miranda Hart, comic actress
 18 December – Melissa Porter, television presenter
 21 December – Gloria De Piero, broadcast political presenter and politician
 Unknown – Sarah Tansey, actress (Heartbeat)

Deaths
 22 September – Val Parnell, 80, television executive and presenter, previously theatrical impresario
 16 October – Leo G. Carroll, 85, actor (The Man from U.N.C.L.E.)

See also
 1972 in British music
 1972 in British radio
 1972 in the United Kingdom
 List of British films of 1972

References